The Association to Unite the Democracies (AUD), is an organization seeking closer cooperation and integration among the world's democratic states. AUD was founded in 1939 by Clarence Streit, The New York Times correspondent at the League of Nations and author of Union Now. It was initially known as the Inter-Democracy Federal Unionists before being renamed Federal Union, Inc. in 1940. The organization's efforts were embraced by Supreme Court Justice Owen Roberts, with figures including Harold L. Ickes and John Foster Dulles also endorsing Streit's proposal for a "Union of free peoples." Federal Union's ideas received a boost with the 1949 founding of the Roberts-chaired Atlantic Union Committee, which pressured Congress to pursue a federation of democracies and on whose board Streit sat. Receiving its present name in 1985, AUD has largely been succeeded by two affiliated organizations, the Streit Council and the Ashburn Institute. It is currently the sponsor of the Mayme and Herb Frank Scholarship Program funded by the Frank Educational Trust, offering financial assistance for graduate research on international integration and global federalism.

See also 
 Streit Council

References

External links
 

Organizations established in 1939
International organizations based in the United States